Albina Rrahmani (born 24 February 1989) is a Kosovan-born Albanian footballer who plays as a defender for Albanian club Vllaznia Shkodër and the Albania women's national team.

See also
List of Albania women's international footballers

References

External links 
 

1989 births
Living people
Albanian women's footballers
Women's association football defenders
KFF Vllaznia Shkodër players
Albania women's international footballers
Sportspeople from Pristina
Kosovan women's footballers
KFF Hajvalia players
Kosovan people of Albanian descent
Sportspeople of Albanian descent